Saint John Church is a Roman Catholic church and parish in Middletown, Connecticut, part of the Diocese of Norwich.

History

In the early 19th Century, immigrants from Ireland moved in large numbers to Middletown. By 1830 there were enough families there to form a vibrant and close-knit Irish community that desired its own place of worship. In 1841, two acres of land were purchased on the current site of the Church. Most of the future parishioners of Saint John worked across the river in the brownstone quarries of Portland and the owners of the quarries donated large blocks of brownstone to help build the first church.

Oldest Church of the Diocese 
Since Saint John Church was built back in 1843 and the Diocese of Norwich was not created until August 6, 1953, by Pope Pius XII the Church is the oldest Church in the Diocese (as it actually pre-dated it) it is known as the Oldest Church of the Diocese. The Archdiocese of Hartford, in fact, had ecclesiastical jurisdiction of the Church until 1953.

Buildings

The imposing 1843 Irish-influenced ecclesiastical Gothic Revival church building was designed by architect, Patrick Charles Keely and it was built by local Irish immigrants that were led by prominent local builder Barzialli Sage. The original church that was completed in 1843 was just a small church building and the existing spire for the Church was erected in 1864. There have been three renovations to the exterior of the building. The 1864 building is now the sacristy for St. John's and the current church was finished in 1852. The Church can hold up to one thousand worshipers. The interior walls of the Church were frescoed by William Borgett, a local artist and there have been several interior renovations over the years.

The building is listed as significant contributing property of the City of Middletown Historic District.

St. Elizabeth Convent 
During the construction of the Church, it was decided that a convent was to be built. Saint Elizabeth Convent was finished in 1873. The convent was used as a Parish Center after the Sisters of Mercy vacated the Property in the 1960s. In 2007, the former convent was demolished due to being in disrepair.

St. John Parochial School 

Saint John Diocesan School was a Catholic parochial elementary school that was operational from 1888 until 2013. The school merged with the Saint Mary Diocesan School to form Saint Pope John Paul II Regional Diocesan School which still operates today serving students from Pre-Kindergarten to 8th Grade.

St. John Graveyard and Cemetery

The Church maintains two cemeteries. The original graveyard is located directly behind the church and the newer cemetery is located on Johnson Street in Middletown.

Yoked Parish 
In 2017, the Bishop of Norwich yoked the Parishes of Saint Sebastian and Saint John which means that both parishes share a Priest. Daily Mass and Sunday Masses are held at both Parishes. The Parishes are still their own entities and are not merged into a combined Parish.

List of Priests that Served St. John Church as Pastor/Rector
Rev. John Brady, Sr. (1837-1845)
Rev. John Brady, Jr. (1845-1855)
Rev. Lawrence T.P. Mangan (1855-1857)
Rev. James Lynch (1857-1873)
Rev. Edward J. O'Brien (1873-1876)
Rev. Francis P. O'Keefe (1876-1881)
Rev. Denis Desmond (1881-1885)
Rev. Bernard O'Reilly Sheridan, P.R. (1885-1903)
Rev. James Patrick Donovan, D.D., P.R. (1903-1928)
Rev. Denis F. Baker, P.R. (1928-1931)
Rev. William J. Fitzgerald, P.R. (1931-1934)
Rev. John C. Brennan, P.R. (1934-1944)
Rev. Bernard F. McCarthy (1944-1948)
Mgsr. John J. McGrath (1948-1961)
Mgsr. Edward J. McKenna (1962-1986)
Rev. Joseph C. Ashe (1986-2002)
Rev. Dennis G. Carey (2002-2004)
Rev. Anthony P. Gruber (2004-2005)
Rev. James J. Sucholet (2005-2009)
Rev. Michael L. Phillippino (2009-2017)
Rev. James Thaikoottathil, J.C.D.  (2017–Present)

References

External links 

 Official site
 Diocese of Norwich

Churches in Middletown, Connecticut
Historic district contributing properties in Connecticut
Gothic Revival architecture in Connecticut
National Register of Historic Places in Middlesex County, Connecticut
Churches on the National Register of Historic Places in Connecticut